Demetrius (Dimitri) ( 1413 – 1453) was the second son of King Alexander I of Georgia by his first wife Dulandukht Orbeliani. He was co-king with his father from 1433 to 1442 and with his brother Vakhtang IV from 1442 to 1446. On Vakhtang's death, Demetrius became a de jure king of Georgia but his accession to the throne was precluded by his younger brother George VIII.

Biography
Demetrius first appears in the charter dated to 1413. Traditional Georgian historiography founded by Prince Vakhushti in the 18th century erroneously makes him a younger brother of George VIII and frequently omits him from the list of the kings of Georgia. Demetrius was co-opted by his father Alexander I in 1433. He was sent by him as ambassador to Shah Rukh, Timur's son.

After Alexander I's renouncement of the throne in 1442 in favor of Vakhtang IV, Demetrius remained a co-king with the latter, whereas Alexander's third son, George VIII, was made a co-king appanaged in Kakheti. Upon the death of Vakhtang IV in 1446, Demetrius III was to become de jure king-regnant of Georgia, but the throne was seized by George VIII, inaugurating a series of conflicts which would eventually lead to the dissolution of the kingdom of Georgia by the close of the 15th century. Demetrius retired to the western province of Imereti. He was killed by a horse while hunting in 1453.

Family
Demetrius was married, sometime after 1446, to Gulashar, whom Marie-Félicité Brosset identified with his aunt Gulkan, the widow of Demetrius's paternal uncle George. She died in 1471 or c. 1475. Their son, Constantine II, was the last king of a united Georgia (1478–1490) and the first king of Kartli (1490–1505).

The historian Vakhushti claims that Demetrius had another son, David, who was installed as king in Kakheti in 1465 by the local nobility and founded the dynasty of the kings of Kakheti. Vakhushti makes David the father of George, king of Kakheti, whom he differentiates from George VIII, Demetrius's younger brother, at first king of Georgia and then king of Kakheti. The David of Vakhushti is, however, a fictitious figure.

Ancestry

Notes

References

1410s births
1453 deaths

Year of birth uncertain
15th-century people from Georgia (country)
Kings of Georgia
Bagrationi dynasty of the Kingdom of Georgia
Hunting accident deaths
Eastern Orthodox monarchs
Accidental deaths in Georgia (country)